Mian Tariq Mehmood (born 3 July 1970) is a Pakistani politician who had been a member of the Provisional Assembly of Punjab, from June 2013 to February 2017.

Early life
He was born on 3 July 1970.

Political career
He was elected to the National Assembly of Pakistan as a candidate of Pakistan Muslim League (N) (PML-N) from Constituency NA-98 (Gujranwala-IV) in 2013 Pakistani general election. He received 118,832 votes and defeated Imtiaz Safdar Warraich.

On 25 February 2018, Mehmood announced to quit PML-N for some unclear reason. On 27 February, he joined Pakistan Tehreek-e-Insaf (PTI) and resigned from the National Assembly.

References

Living people
Punjabi people
Pakistani MNAs 2013–2018
1970 births